The 2008 Atlantic Sun men's basketball tournament took place March 5–8, 2008, at Allen Arena in Nashville, Tennessee.

Format
The eight eligible men's basketball teams in the Atlantic Sun Conference receive a berth in the conference tournament.  After the 16 game conference season, teams are seeded by conference record.

Bracket

Sources
Atlantic Sun Basketball Championship

References

2007–08 Atlantic Sun Conference men's basketball season
Tournament
Atlantic Sun men's basketball tournament
Atlantic Sun men's basketball tournament
Basketball competitions in Nashville, Tennessee
College sports tournaments in Tennessee